Ramarosan is a village in Achham District in the Seti Zone of western Nepal. At the time of the 2001 Nepal census, the population was 4399, of which 28% was literate. Beautiful Ramaroshan Area is also located in this VDC.

References

Populated places in Achham District
Village development committees in Achham District